Lophophelma pingbiana is a moth of the family Geometridae first described by Chu in 1981. It is found in Yunnan, China.

References

Moths described in 1981
Pseudoterpnini